This is a list of concentrating solar thermal power (CSTP) companies.  The CSTP industry finished a first round of new construction during 2006/7, a resurgence after more than 15 years of commercial dormancy. 

The CSTP industry saw many new entrants and new manufacturing facilities in 2008. Active project developers grew to include Ausra, Mulk Enpar Renewable Energy, Bright Source Energy, eSolar, FPL Energy, Infinia, Sopogy, and Stirling Energy Systems in the USA. In Spain, Abengoa Solar, Acciona, Iberdrola Renovables, and Sener were active in 2008.

List of notable companies

Parabolic trough collectors:
Aalborg CSP
Abengoa
Acciona
GlassPoint Solar
Rackam
SENER
Solar Millennium (bankruptcy)
Soliterm Group
Sopogy Micro CSP

Solar tower technology:
BrightSource Energy / Luz II
Torresol Energy

Linear fresnel:
AREVA Solar, formerly Ausra
Novatec Solar

Unconfirmed: 
eSolar
Cobra
Iberdrola
SENER
Solar Euromed
Solarlite
SolarReserve
Stirling Energy Systems (filed for bankruptcy)
Wizard Power

See also

List of energy storage projects
List of photovoltaics companies
List of solar thermal power stations
Renewable energy industry

References

External links
Desert Sunrise: Concentrating Solar Power Makes Worldwide Progress 
Low-cost Solar Thermal Plants at Heart of Algerian-German Research Push 
ABROS green GmbH 

Solar
Renewable energy organizations
Solar